Constantine Alexander Payne (born February 10, 1961) is an American film director, screenwriter and producer. He is best known for the films Citizen Ruth (1996), Election (1999), About Schmidt (2002), Sideways (2004), The Descendants (2011), Nebraska (2013) and Downsizing (2017). He is noted for his dark humor and satirical depictions of contemporary American society. Payne is a two-time winner of the Academy Award for Best Adapted Screenplay, and a three-time nominee of the Academy Award for Best Director. In 2017, Metacritic ranked Payne 2nd on its list of the 25 best film directors of the 21st century.

Early life
Payne was born in Omaha, Nebraska, to Peggy and George Payne, restaurant owners. He is the youngest of three sons and grew up in the Dundee neighborhood.

He is of Greek ancestry. Payne's paternal grandfather, Nicholas "Nick" Payne, anglicized the last name from "Papadopoulos". His family comes from three areas in Greece: the island of Syros, Livadia, and Aegio.

Payne's family was part of the fabric of Omaha, which he refers to as part of his upbringing. His grandfather was a founder of The Virginia Cafe, with Payne's father taking over the restaurant. Payne went there regularly as a child. The restaurant was destroyed in a fire in 1969; the W. Dale Clark Library was later built on the site.

Payne's paternal grandmother, Clara Payne (née Hoffman), was from a German Nebraska family from Lincoln, Nebraska.

In Omaha, Payne attended Brownell-Talbot School, Dundee Elementary School, and Lewis and Clark Junior High. He graduated from Creighton Prep for high school in 1979. At Prep, Payne wrote a humor column for his high school newspaper and was the editor of the high school yearbook.

Payne then attended Stanford University, where he majored in Spanish and History. As a part of his Spanish degree, he studied at Spain's University of Salamanca. He later lived a few months in Medellin, Colombia, where he published an article about social changes between 1900 and 1930. Payne received his MFA in 1990 from the UCLA Film School.

Career

Early work 
In the 1960s, Payne's father received a Super 8mm projector from Kraft Foods as a loyalty reward, and eventually passed it on to his son when Alexander was about 14 years old.

A short time after getting his MFA from UCLA Film School—and after his successful thesis film, The Passion of Martin had attracted industry attention—Payne got a writing/directing deal with Universal Pictures. The ensuing screenplay, which was turned down, would ultimately become About Schmidt. He says that he cleared about $60,000, which was enough to fund his simple lifestyle at the time for about five years.

Payne has said he sees his talent as being one of learned economy, referring to the essay written by Tennessee Williams on The Catastrophe of Success.

1990s 
Payne worked in various capacities on films and television before he co-wrote and directed his first full-length film, Citizen Ruth (1996). The film is a satirical black comedy revolving around the issue of abortion rights. The film stars Laura Dern as a dim witted woman with substance abuse issues who happens to get pregnant. She unexpectedly becomes a pawn of figures from both sides of the abortion debate. The film co-stars Kelly Preston, Burt Reynolds, and Tippi Hedren. The film premiered at the 1996 Sundance Film Festival where it received favorable reviews.

His second film, Election, starring Matthew Broderick and Reese Witherspoon, which takes aim at politics and education in America, attracted attention when New Yorker film critic David Denby named it the best film of 1999. Payne received his first Academy Award for Writing Adapted Screenplay nomination for Election. Roger Ebert gave the film three and a half stars out of four, praising Witherspoon and Payne, and saying, "...here is a movie that is not simply about an obnoxious student, but also about an imperfect teacher, a lockstep administration, and a student body that is mostly just marking time until it can go out into the world and occupy valuable space". The film became a cult classic with Election is ranking #61 on Bravo's "100 Funniest Movies" and #9 on Entertainment Weeklys list of the "50 Best High School Movies", while Witherspoon's performance was ranked at #45 on the list of the "100 Greatest Film Performances of All Time" by Premiere. According to Payne, it is also President Barack Obama's favorite political film.

2000s
In 2002, Payne's film About Schmidt, about a recently retired widower who embarks on a journey to his estranged daughter's wedding, was released. The film starred Jack Nicholson as the title character, Warren Schmidt, and its script was based on the novel of the same name by Louis Begley. The film also co-starred Hope Davis, Dermot Mulroney, June Squibb, and Kathy Bates. The film premiered at the 55th Cannes Film Festival to rave reviews, with critics highlighting Nicholson's performance. Payne received a Golden Globe for the screenplay, which was also nominated for a Writers Guild of America Award for Best Adapted Screenplay. To the surprise of many who kept track of Hollywood news, Payne and his writing partner Jim Taylor were not nominated for an Oscar for the About Schmidt screenplay.

In 2004, Payne followed About Schmidt with Sideways, a film about two middle aged men who embark on a week-long road trip to Santa Barbara County wine country to celebrate Jack's upcoming wedding. The film stars Paul Giamatti, Thomas Hayden Church as the two friends with Virginia Madsen and Sandra Oh. The film premiered at the Toronto International Film Festival where it received rave reviews. Roger Ebert of the Chicago Sun-Times gave the film four stars, saying: "what happens during the seven days adds up to the best human comedy of the year – comedy, because it is funny, and human, because it is surprisingly moving." Payne won both the Academy Award and Golden Globe in 2005 for Best Adapted Screenplay, while the film also won the Golden Globe Award for Best Motion Picture – Musical or Comedy. In total, Sideways received five Academy Award nominations including Best Picture.

2010s
Payne returned to directing in 2011 after a seven-year hiatus with the film The Descendants, a film about a man dealing with the aftermath of a boating accident involving his wife, leaving her in a coma. The film starred George Clooney, Shaliene Woodley, Beau Bridges, Judy Greer, Matthew Lillard, and Robert Forster. The film premiered at the 2011 Toronto International Film Festival where it received near universal praise ending up on many critics top 10 list of the year. Payne also co-wrote the screenplay along with Nat Faxon, and Jim Rash who all won the Academy Award for Best Adapted Screenplay.

Payne's Nebraska starred veteran character actor Bruce Dern and Saturday Night Live alumnus Will Forte. It was released on November 15, 2013.

Payne has said that during his seven-year hiatus between Sideways (2004) and The Descendants (2011), he, along with working partner Jim Taylor, were developing the satire Downsizing, which Payne has described as "a large canvas, science-fiction social satire" and "an epic masterpiece." The film, about an impoverished married couple who decide the way ahead lies in shrinking themselves, was to star Paul Giamatti and Reese Witherspoon, but was superseded by The Descendants and Nebraska. In March 2016, Witherspoon was replaced by Kristen Wiig and Giamatti by Matt Damon. Hong Chau, Christoph Waltz, Udo Kier, Neil Patrick Harris, and Jason Sudeikis also starred. Paramount Pictures released the film on December 22, 2017. It has received mixed reviews, with many critics describing it as the weakest film of Payne's career.

2020s
In June 2021, it was announced that Payne will direct Paul Giamatti in the David Hemingson-scripted film The Holdovers for Miramax.

 Additional work 
Payne executive produced the short film Run Fast. Anna Musso, his long-time assistant and protege, wrote and directed the film, which shot in March 2014. The project was partially funded by a Kickstarter campaign.

In 2000, Payne completed an uncredited polish-up of the screenplay for the comedy film Meet the Parents. In 2001, Payne wrote a draft of Jurassic Park III.

Payne served as an executive producer on the films King of California and The Savages. He also collaborated once again with writing partner Jim Taylor to write a draft of the screenplay for the film I Now Pronounce You Chuck and Larry, a comedy directed by Dennis Dugan, and starring Adam Sandler and Kevin James. Payne disliked the final product, stating that Adam Sandler rewrote so much of the story that almost all of what Payne and Taylor wrote was gone.

Payne was also executive producer of the acclaimed 2014 film Kumiko, the Treasure Hunter directed by David Zellner.

Unrealized projects
In 1999, it was reported that Payne was in talks to direct Esquivel, a biopic starring John Leguizamo as Mexican musician Juan García Esquivel. In 2000, it was reported that Payne was to co-write and direct an untitled film inspired by Oscar Wilde’s The Picture of Dorian Gray
however nothing more was heard of this project.

In November 2010, it was reported that Payne would possibly direct the film adaptation of Daniel Clowes's graphic novel Wilson. Then in November 2011, Payne confirmed that he was to direct Wilson next after Nebraska (2013). However, Payne officially confirmed in a 2014 interview with Parade that he was no longer attached to the Wilson project.

In 2012, it was reported that Payne and Jim Taylor wrote a script titled The Lost Cause.  That project is said to be an expansion of Taylor’s 2004 short film of the same name.

In November 2013, Payne was in talks to direct a film titled The Judge's Will for Fox Searchlight Pictures. The project was to have been based on a New Yorker article written by Ruth Prawer Jhabvala about an elderly judge from Delhi who wants to make sure his much younger wife will be taken care of after his death. In May 2018, it was reported that James Ivory would write the screenplay of the project for Payne. In June 2018, it was reported that Payne will possibly shoot The Judge's Will in Chicago.

In February 2016, it was announced that Payne was to direct a film titled My Saga, which is based on a pair of articles written by Karl Ove Knausgård and published by The New York Times Magazine. The articles cover Knausgård tracing the Vikings' voyages in North America. The film was to have been distributed by Netflix and star Mads Mikkelsen. In October 2019, the production was cancelled a week before filming was to begin due to Knausgard objecting to his life story being turned into a feature film.

In March 2018, Payne was in talks to direct a legal drama film for Amazon Studios titled The Burial. The project was to have been based on the true story of Mississippi-based lawyer Willie Gary, who takes on the case of Jeremiah O'Keefe, an owner of a chain of funeral homes who claimed he was swindled by a major funeral parlor conglomerate.

It was reported in February 2019 that Payne was attached to direct a comedy horror film titled The Menu for Gary Sanchez Productions. The plot concerns a young couple that attends an exclusive restaurant in a tropical island only to experience some "shocking surprises." By April 2019, Emma Stone and Ralph Fiennes were set to star in the film. By May 2020, Mark Mylod replaced Payne on The Menu.

In December 2019, it was announced that Payne was attached to direct an American remake of the 1987 Oscar-winning Danish film Babette's Feast. Payne's version is said to be set in Minnesota.

Also in December 2019, it was announced that Payne was going to direct the HBO miniseries Landscapers.  However, in October 2020, it was announced that Payne dropped out of the project due to a schedule conflict and was replaced by Will Sharpe.

It was also announced in the 2010s that Payne was going to direct a film titled La Vida Norteña.  The project was to have been about a Latin music promoter who befriends a Nebraskan mayor.

It has also been reported that Payne was to direct a film titled Fork in the Road.  That project was to have been an adaptation of a novel by Denis Hamill.

 Themes 
He has set many of his films in Omaha, his hometown. His films sometimes include scenes of historical landmarks, black and white photographs, and museums, and he often uses amateur actors for minor roles.

Payne is on the short list of directors who have final cut rights for their films.

In 2005, he became a member of the Board of Governors of the Academy of Motion Picture Arts and Sciences (Directors Branch).

Personal life
Family
Payne married Canadian actress Sandra Oh on January 1, 2003, after dating her for three years, and collaborating with her in Sideways. On March 12, 2005, a publicist announced their separation. The divorce was officially finalized on December 22, 2006, although the former couple took more than two years to settle their finances. In 2015, Payne married Maria Kontos, whom he met while visiting the Aigio region of Greece where some of his ancestors originated.They welcomed a daughter in 2017. The pair filed for divorce in 2021 and it was finalized in 2022. In 2022 he received Greek citizenship. 

Philanthropy and business ventures
Payne is on the Board of Directors of an Omaha non-profit film theater, Film Streams. He maintains a passion for preservation. In recent years, he helped preserve a historic film theater in Scottsbluff, Nebraska.

Payne was co-owner (along with friend Ann Beeder) of King Fong (now permanently closed), a Chinese restaurant in Omaha.

Payne is a long-time supporter of the Nebraska Coast Connection, a social networking organization that meets monthly in Culver City, California. In November 2013, he held a special screening of Nebraska for the group's members at the Sherry Lansing Theatre on the Paramount Studios lot.

Statutory rape allegation
In a 2018 interview with Ronan Farrow, actress Rose McGowan accused a "prominent” man in Hollywood of statutory rape but she did not name the person in question. In August 2020, McGowan said it was Payne and that he committed the act sometime in 1988 or 1989, when McGowan was 15 years old and Payne was about 28 years old. Payne responded to McGowan's allegation by writing a guest column in Deadline Hollywood in which he admitted to a consensual relationship with her, but denied any impropriety, alleging that they had met in 1991 when she was over the age of consent, which is 18 in California. Payne ended his statement writing, "While I cannot allow false statements about events 29 years ago to go uncorrected, I will continue to wish only the best for Rose".

Filmography
Short films

Feature films

 Awards Directed Academy Award performances'''

Payne has directed multiple Oscar nominated performances.

In 2012, he was named as a member of the Jury for the Main Competition at the 2012 Cannes Film Festival. His 2013 film Nebraska was nominated for the Palme d'Or at the 2013 Cannes Film Festival. With his Academy Award nomination for Nebraska in 2014, Payne has been nominated seven times, winning the Academy Award for Best Adapted Screenplay twice.

In 2014, The Location Managers Guild of America honored Alexander with their inaugural Eva Monley Award for his masterful use of location as another character.

Books

Levinson, Julie, ed. Alexander Payne Interviews. University Press of Mississippi, 2014. http://www.upress.state.ms.us/books/1941 
 Payne, Alexander, and James Zemaitis. The Coffee Table Coffee Table Book. London: Black Dog Pub, 2003. 
 Payne, Alexander, and Jim Taylor. The Sideways Guide to Wine and Life. New York: Newmarket, 2005. Illustrated by Rex Pickett. 

References

Levinson, Julie, ed. Alexander Payne Interviews''. University Press of Mississippi, 2014. http://www.upress.state.ms.us/books/1714

External links

 

1961 births
American film directors
American male screenwriters
Best Adapted Screenplay Academy Award winners
Best Adapted Screenplay BAFTA Award winners
Independent Spirit Award for Best Director winners
Living people
Entertainers from Nebraska
Writers from Omaha, Nebraska
Stanford University alumni
UCLA Film School alumni
Writers Guild of America Award winners
Greek-American culture in Omaha, Nebraska
American writers of Greek descent
American people of German descent
American film producers
Best Screenplay Golden Globe winners
Golden Globe Award-winning producers
English-language film directors
University of Salamanca alumni
Screenwriters from Nebraska